Michael S. Drew (January 9, 1827 – August 8, 1908) was an American politician in the state of Washington. He served in the Washington House of Representatives from 1889 to 1891.

References

Members of the Washington House of Representatives
1827 births
1908 deaths
People from Machias, Maine
19th-century American politicians